Statistics of Lao Premier League in the 2015 season. The league is composed of clubs starts on 28 February 2015. Hoang Anh Attapeu are the defending champions, having won their first league title in 2014.

Clubs 
Champasak United
Ezra 
Hoang Anh Attapeu
Lanexang United 
Lao Police Club
Young Elephant
SHB Vientiane
Lao Toyota FC
EDL FC
Eastern Star FC
Savan FC

Format 
Over the course of a season, which runs annually from January to July, each team plays twice against the others in the league, once at 'home' and once 'away'. Three points are awarded for a win, one for a draw and zero for a loss. The teams are ranked in the league table by points gained, then goal difference, then goals scored and then their head-to-head record for that season.

Stadium

League table

Top scorers

References

External links 
Lao League at rsssf.com

Lao Premier League seasons
1
Laos
Laos